The National Assembly and the King of Saint Christopher and Nevis jointly make up the legislature of Saint Kitts and Nevis.

Composition of the National Assembly

The assembly has 14 or 15 members (depending upon circumstances), 11 of whom are elected for a five-year term in single-seat constituencies and are known as Representatives. The remaining four are called Senators; three are appointed by the governor-general and the fourth is the attorney-general (i.e. an ex officio member).

The 1983 constitution mandates at least three senators, or four if the attorney-general is not one of these three appointed senators. The number can be increased by the parliament as long as it doesn't exceed two thirds of the number of representatives. Except for the attorney-general, the senators are appointed by the governor-general, acting on the advice of the prime minister in two of the appointments and the leader of the opposition for the third one.

Legislative authority
Parliament is empowered by the 1983 constitution to make laws for the Peace, order, and good government of the federation, excepting those areas in the exclusive competence of the Nevis Island Legislature. Following passage by the National Assembly, Royal Assent is required to be given by the Governor-General of Saint Kitts and Nevis.

Amendments to the constitution require a two-thirds supermajority in the Assembly.

Latest election

Speaker of the National Assembly
The Assembly has a speaker and deputy speaker elected by the members of the parliament during its first meeting following a general election. They  do not have to be members of it; but if they are then they cannot also be in the  cabinet or parliamentary secretaries.

The current speaker of the National Assembly of Saint Kitts and Nevis is Lanien Blanchette, who has been in office since October 2022. She succeeded Anthony Michael Perkins.

Previous speakers
Speakers of the Legislative Council of Saint Christopher-Nevis-Anguilla

Speakers of the National Assembly of St Kitts and Nevis

See also

Politics of Saint Kitts and Nevis
List of legislatures by country

References

1983 Saint Kitts and Nevis Constitution

Saint Kitts
Government of Saint Kitts and Nevis
Government agencies established in 1983
Saint Kitts and Nevis
Saint Kitts and Nevis